Guo Linyao (born 10 March 1972) is a Chinese former gymnast who competed in the 1992 Summer Olympics.
Coach Linyao Guo was born in China.  He was born into a well-known gymnastics family.  Both his mother, Huiqi Suo, and father, Shuzeng Guo were gymnasts on the Chinese National Team.  He has two older brothers, Guo Linsheng and Guo Linxian, and one older sister, Guo Linhong who were all internationally competing gymnasts.  His family, the "Guo" (国/國) - meaning Nation, is well known among the Chinese gymnastics field.

References

1972 births
Living people
Chinese male artistic gymnasts
Olympic gymnasts of China
Gymnasts at the 1992 Summer Olympics
Olympic silver medalists for China
Olympic bronze medalists for China
Olympic medalists in gymnastics
Asian Games medalists in gymnastics
Gymnasts at the 1990 Asian Games
Gymnasts at the 1994 Asian Games
Asian Games gold medalists for China
Asian Games silver medalists for China
Medalists at the 1990 Asian Games
Medalists at the 1994 Asian Games
Medalists at the 1992 Summer Olympics
Medalists at the World Artistic Gymnastics Championships